Darwan Singh Negi VC (4 March 188324 June 1950) was one of the first Indian soldiers to be awarded the Victoria Cross (VC), the highest and most prestigious award for gallantry in the face of the enemy that can be awarded to British and Commonwealth forces.

Early life
Negi was born to a farming family in Kafarteer village in the Garhwal District of the North-Western Provinces in India. In 1902, at the age of 19,  he joined the 39th Garhwal Rifles, Indian Army.

World War I
When the First World War broke out in 1914, the regiment travelled to France as part of the 7th (Meerut) Division of the Indian Corps. Negi was a 33 year old naik (equivalent to corporal) in the 1st Battalion, 39th Garhwal Rifles, British Indian Army during the First World War when he performed the deed during the Defence of Festubert for which he was awarded the VC.

Victoria Cross
The citation of the VC reads:

He was awarded the medal on the same day as Khudadad Khan VC; but Khan's VC action was of earlier date, so that he is regarded as the first Indian recipient.

Negi retired with the rank of subedar, equivalent to a British captain. Both his son Balbir and Balbir's son Nitin served in the Garhwal Rifles of the Indian Army; both achieved the rank of colonel. His Victoria Cross is held by his family. The regimental museum of the Garhwal Rifles in Lansdowne, Uttarakhand is named the Darwan Singh Museum in his honour.

See also
 Gabar Singh Negi, another World War I Victoria Cross recipient from Uttarakhand

References

External links
 First ever Indian to get Victoria Cross from H.M. the King Emperor in the field of battle India's Army by Donovan Jackson (Sampson Low, Marston & Co, London. 1940).
 Darwan Singh Negi Winthrop University.
 Burial location Victoriacross.org.uk.
 

1883 births
1950 deaths
British Indian Army officers
British Indian Army soldiers
Indian Army personnel of World War I
People from Chamoli district
Indian World War I recipients of the Victoria Cross
Military personnel from Uttarakhand
Military personnel of British India